Paddington is a British-French media franchise based on the character Paddington Bear, created by British author Michael Bond. The  franchise began with the 2014 film of the same name. A sequel was released in 2017 and a third film went into development. The films have also spawned a TV series, and a short film. All films and TV series see Ben Whishaw play Paddington.

Films

Paddington (2014)

This is the first and only film to be distributed by The Weinstein Company in the US, as the rights to the film series were sold to Warner Bros. Pictures following the Weinstein scandal in October 2017.

Paddington 2 (2017)

In April 2015, David Heyman confirmed that he would produce the second film in the franchise. It was also announced that Paul King would direct and co-write with Simon Farnaby. By October 2016, the cast of Paddington – Hugh Bonneville, Sally Hawkins, Julie Walters, Jim Broadbent, Peter Capaldi, Madeleine Harris, Samuel Joslin, Ben Whishaw and Imelda Staunton – were confirmed to be returning for the sequel, joined by new cast members Hugh Grant and Brendan Gleeson. Principal photography began in the same month. Framestore provided the visual effects for the film. Filming in Little Venice took place for three days. Filming also took place at Shepton Mallet Prison.

Paddington in Peru (TBA)

In June 2016, StudioCanal CEO Didier Lupfer stated that the studio was committed to making a third Paddington film. In November 2017, David Heyman told Digital Spy that though the script for a third Paddington film had not developed, discussions about locations, ideas and scenes had already begun.  In November 2018, Heyman noted that a third film was still likely to happen, but that Paul King would not be back to direct, though he would still be involved in a prominent creative capacity. In February 2021, Paddington 3 officially began development. At the 2021 Cannes Film Festival, StudioCanal announced that Paddington 3 would commence shooting in the second quarter of 2022. The films' previous director Paul King will not be directing the film as he is helming the film Wonka starring Timothée Chalamet. King is set to executive produce the film and has written a story alongside Simon Farnaby and Mark Burton with a screenplay by Burton, Jon Foster and James Lamont. On June 13, it was announced that the title of the film will be Paddington in Peru and will be directed by Dougal Wilson, with principal photography now set to begin in 2023 in London and Peru with some of the cast returning. In February 2023 Whishaw stated that he had yet to read a script and was unsure whether development was continuing.

But a few weeks later, Novel Entertainment announced that they had cancelled the film and replaced it with new ones based on the television series Horrid Henry.

Television series

In October 2017, it was announced that StudioCanal was producing an animated series based on the films, set to launch in either late 2018 or early 2019. It was announced in February 2019, that the series will launch worldwide in 2020 on Nickelodeon, with Whishaw reprising his voice of Paddington.

The title of the series will be The Adventures of Paddington.

On 20 November 2019, it was announced that the series will premiere on 20 January 2020 after a sneak preview which aired on 20 December 2019.

Short film

For the "Platinum Party at the Palace" music concert that would open the Platinum Jubilee of Elizabeth II, the Queen acted in a short film Directed By Mark Burton to open the concert, later titled as "🥪 👜 Ma’amalade sandwich Your Majesty?", in which the Queen hosts Paddington Bear (with Whishaw reprising his role) for tea in honour of the Jubilee. The Queen is seen patiently tolerating a tea-slurping Paddington who, upon realising his mistake, attempts to pour tea for her. However, he stomps over a pastry on the table and ends up covering a footman (played by Simon Farnaby) in cream. As the bear offers the Queen a marmalade sandwich, and tells her that he always keeps one for emergencies, the Queen confides "So do I" and, prising open her handbag, tells him: "I keep mine in here". Later, the bear congratulates the Queen on her reign, exclaiming: "Happy Jubilee Ma'am. And thank you for everything". The sequence ends with both the Queen and Paddington using a spoon to tap out the beat of Queen's "We Will Rock You" on teacup.

The Queen spent around half a day filming the sketch at Windsor Castle, and had since kept it a secret from some of her family members. A Buckingham Palace spokesman stated: "While the Queen may not be attending the concert in person, she was very keen that people understood how much it meant to her and that all those watching had a great time. [...] Her Majesty is well known for her sense of humour, so it should be no surprise that she decided to take part in tonight's sketch."

Cast and characters

Production
The first film of the series was announced in September 2007, with David Heyman producing and Hamish McColl writing the screenplay. When filming began, Heyman announced the casting of Colin Firth as the voice of Paddington. Paddington is the most expensive film produced by the French production company StudioCanal.

In June 2014, after principal photography had wrapped, Firth voluntarily dropped out of the film, after the studio decided his voice was not suitable for Paddington. The role was recast the following month, with Ben Whishaw signing on to voice the title role. Paddington was created using a combination of computer-generated imagery (by the British company Framestore) and animatronics.

The creator of the Paddington character, Michael Bond, also appeared in a cameo in the first film, playing the role of the Kindly Gentleman.

When the two films were dubbed into Ukrainian, Paddington was voiced by Volodymyr Zelenskyy.

Crew

Reception

Box office performance

Critical reception

BAFTA Awards

References

British children's comedy films
British comedy films
British children's fantasy films
French children's films
English-language films
Films about bears
Film series based on British novels
Film series based on children's books
Films produced by David Heyman
Films set in London
Films using motion capture
StudioCanal films